Li Jinming (born 21 November 1985), also known as Kimi Li, is a Chinese actress and hostess.

Li is noted for playing Chen Meijia in the romantic comedy television series iPartment, which enjoyed the highest ratings in China when it was broadcast.

Early life and education
Li was born in Jinan, Shandong on November 21, 1985. She graduated from Shanghai Theatre Academy, majoring in acting.

Acting career
In 2007, Li attended the Juedui Changxiang in Jiangsu Television and she ended up in the seventh position.

Li joined Anhui Television and hosted Sunday Best since June 2009.

In 2009, Li starred in a romantic comedy television series IPartment, alongside Eric Wang, Deng Jiajia, Michael Chen, Loura Lou, Sean Sun, Jean Lee and Vanessa Zhao, the series was one of the most watched TV shows in mainland China in that year. Sun also filmed in a number of successful sequels to IPartment.

Li had a minor role as He Xiaoyi in the historical television series A Weaver on the Horizon (2010), which starred Liu Shishi as Princess Jiayi and Janine Chang as Huang Daopo.

Li co-starred with Janine Chang, Zhou Zihan, Mike He, Li Zhinan and Li Yifeng in the 2011 modern idol drama Sunny Happiness as Kong Xinjie.

In 2012, Li appeared in Happy Michelin Kitchen, a romantic comedy television series starring Lan Cheng Long, Cheryl Yang, Wu Jianfei and Ying'er.

In 2014, Li played Keke in the wuxia television series The Flying Daggers, which adapted from Gu Long's wuxia novel of the same title. She also filmed in Women on the Breadfruit Tree, Loli's Beautiful Days and Strange Stories from a Chinese Studio.

Filmography

Film

Television

Variety show

Singles

Book

References

External links

1985 births
Shanghai Theatre Academy alumni
Actresses from Jinan
Living people
Chinese film actresses
Chinese television actresses